Four Australian naval vessels have been named HMAS Paluma after an Aboriginal word meaning "thunder":

 was a gunboat built for the Queensland colonial navy in 1884. She was acquired by the Royal Australian Navy (RAN) in 1913, and was sold into civilian service in 1916.
, an auxiliary patrol boat built in 1941
, formerly Motor Stores Lighter No. 252 (MSL 252), was altered during construction into a survey ship, and completed in 1945
, lead ship of the Paluma-class motor launches, built in 1989 and in service as of 2016

Battle honours
Ships named HMAS Paluma are entitled to bear a single battle honour:
New Guinea 1942–43

References

Royal Australian Navy ship names